Kusha, also rendered Kusa (Sanskrit: कुश) and his twin brother Lava are the children of Rama and Sita in Hindu tradition. Their story is recounted in the Hindu epic Ramayana, and its other versions.

Birth and childhood

The first chapter of Ramayana, Balakanda mentioned Valmiki narrating the Ramayana to his disciples, Lava and Kusha. But their birth and childhood is mentioned in the last chapter Uttara Kanda, which is not believed to be the original work of Valmiki. According to the legend, a pregnant queen Sita leaves the kingdom of Ayodhya when she learns that the citizens were suspicious when a washerman of Ayodhya questioned Sita's fidelity. She then took refuge in the ashram of the sage Valmiki located on the banks of the Tamsa River. Sita gave birth to twin sons, Lava and Kusha, at the ashram. They were educated and trained in military skills under the tutelage of Valmiki, and also learned the story of Rama.

Ashvamedha Yajna

During an Ashvamedha Yajna held by Rama, the sage Valmiki, along with Lava and Kusha, attended with Sita in disguise.

Lava and Kusha chanted the Ramayana in the presence of Rama and a vast audience. When Lava and Kusha recited about Sita's exile, Rama became grief-stricken and Valmiki produced Sita. Sita, struck with embarrassment and grief, called upon the earth, her mother (Bhūmi), to receive her and as the ground opened, she vanished into it. Rama then learned that Lava and Kusha were his children.

In some versions, Lava and Kusha capture the horse of the sacrifice and defeat Rama's brothers and their army. When Rama came to fight with them, Maharishi Valmiki intervenes, and Sita discloses to their sons that their father is Rama.

Legends

Kushavati was a city in Kosala Kingdom as related in the epic Ramayana. The king of Kosala, Rama, installed his son Lava at Shravasti and Kusha at Kushavati.

Cantos sixteen to nineteen of the Ānanda Rāmāyaṇa describe the exploits of Rama's progeny. The manifestation of a Goddess appears before Kusha, declaring to be the Tutelary deity of the ancient capital of Ayodhya. She described the condition of the deserted city, which had been abandoned and ruined since King Ram became inactive for some time. Kusha sets forth with his whole army to restore the city to its former splendor.

Canto sixteen describes Kushas marriage with the Naga Queen Kumudvatī. While residing in Ayodhya in the summer, Kusha goes to the Sarayu to bathe with the ladies of the court. While sporting in the river, he loses a great gem bestowed to him by his father. In anger, Kusha threatens to shoot an arrow into the river, whereupon the river parted revealing Kumudvatī.

Canto seventeen describes the final years of Kusha. Kusha and Kumudvati have a son named Atithi, who becomes heir to the kingdom. Kusha engages in a battle with a demon named Durjaya and gives his life in the process of slaying his adversary. Cantos eighteen and nineteen describe the 21 Kings that succeeded Atithi.

In popular culture 
Hindu traditions claim that Kusha ruled the entire region of Kashmir, Indus River and Hindu Kush as frontier lands of India known as Hindu Kush Kshetra and founded the city of Kashmir in the valley and Kasur, though local lore contends Kasur was founded in 1525 by Pashtun migrants. His brother Lava is traditionally believed to have founded Lavapuri (present-day city of Lahore).

References

Solar dynasty
 Characters_in_the_Ramayana